Julia Clare Buckingham  (born 18 October 1950) is a British pharmacologist, academic and academic administrator. She is the former Vice Chancellor of Brunel University London, UK.

Early life
Buckingham was born on 18 October 1950. She attended St Mary's School, Calne from 1960 to 1968.  She then studied zoology at the University of Sheffield from 1968 - 1971. She received her PhD degree in pharmacology at the University of London, Royal Free Hospital School of Medicine. In 1987, she received her DSc degree from the same university.

Career
Buckingham started her career in 1971 as a research assistant at Glaxo Laboratories, UK. From 1974-1980, she became a research fellow at the department of pharmacology, University of London. From 1980-1987, she became a senior lecturer at the same university. From 1988-1997, she became a professor of pharmacology and was head of department of pharmacology, Charing Cross and Westminster Hospital, University of London. 
From 1992-1997, she became the assistant Dean. In 1997, she moved to Imperial College London to be professor of pharmacology. In 2000, she became the college Dean in nonclinical medicine at Imperial College London. In 2007, she became Pro-rector (education) and in 2010 she became Pro-rector (education and academic affairs) at the same university.

In 2012, she left Imperial College London to be Vice Chancellor of Brunel University London. In August 2019, she additionally became the President of Universities UK. Following the announcement of her intention to leave Brunel, she became Chair of the Institute of Cancer Research on 1 August 2021.

Awards
Buckingham was elected as a fellow of the British Pharmacological Society in 2004. In 2011, she was elected an honorary member of the British Society for Neuroendocrinology. In 2017, she received the Society for Endocrinology Jubilee Medal. In 2018, she was appointed by the Queen a Commander of the Order of the British Empire (CBE). She was elected a fellow of the Academy of Medical Sciences in 2019.

Selected works

References 

Living people
British pharmacologists
Alumni of the University of Sheffield
Alumni of the University of London
Academics of Imperial College London
Academics of Brunel University London
Fellows of the Academy of Medical Sciences (United Kingdom)
People educated at St Mary's School, Calne
Vice-Chancellors by university in the United Kingdom
1950 births